Ilyinka is a rural locality (a settlement) in Alexandrovskoye Rural Settlement, Talovsky District, Voronezh Oblast, Russia. The population was 283 as of 2010.

Ilyinka was founded in 1920-21 by Subbotniks. Between 1973 and 1991, almost all the Subbotniks of Ilyinka emigrated to Israel.

Geography 
Ilyinka is located 28 km northeast of Talovaya (the district's administrative centre) by road. Kazanka is the nearest rural locality.

References 

Rural localities in Talovsky District